Holjapyx imbutus is a species of forcepstail in the family Japygidae occurring in North America.

References

Diplura
Articles created by Qbugbot
Animals described in 1959